Annan Thampi is a 2008 Indian Malayalam-language action comedy film directed by Anwar Rasheed, starring Mammootty, Lakshmi Rai and Gopika. Mammootty plays twins Achu and Appu in the film. The film was a Blockbuster success at the box office.

Plot
Annan Thampi is the story of twin brothers, Appu and Achu. Appu is a bully who always finds himself in trouble whereas Achu is a naïve mute kid. Their father Ravunni, a ballet artiste, separates them due to sibling rivalry and Appu is sent to live with relatives in Pollachi.

30 years later, Appu grows up to be a lovable thug who falls for Thenmozhi, while Achu marries Lakshmi. But soon major misunderstandings created by their enemies crop up and the brothers are baying for each other's blood. This is due to misunderstanding created by the villain Govindan, who masquerades as his friend. Eventually, they come to the realisation that others were behind their enmity. They patch up their differences and take on their foes.

Cast

 Mammootty as Appu and Achu (twin brothers)
Body Doubling by Tini Tom
 Sonu as young Appu and Monu as young Achu
 Lakshmi Rai as Thenmozhi, Appu's wife
 Gopika as Lakshmi, Achu's wife
 Janardhanan as Ravunni, Achu and Appu's father
 Siddique as Bharathan
 Harisree Ashokan as Chandran
 Suraj Venjarammoodu as Peethambaran
 Salim Kumar as Sub Inspector Shyamalan
 Rajan P. Dev as Dharmarajan, Thenmozhi's uncle
 Bose Venkat as Circle Inspector Anbuarasan
 Maniyanpilla Raju as Appu's and Achu's uncle at Pollachi
 Urmila Unni as Padmavathy, Achu and Appu's mother
 Shivani Bhai as Ammu, Achu and Appu's sister
 Jayan Cherthala as Madhava Panicker, the astrologer and Bharathan's father
 Mohan Jose as Vijayan, Madhavan's brother-in-law and Bharathan's uncle
 K. P. A. C. Lalitha as Bhadra, Madhavan's sister and Bharathan's aunt
 Anil Murali as Govindan (Bharathan's friend and co-conspirator)
 Joju George as Prakashan
 Kiran Raj as Shiva
 Bijukuttan as Santhosh, dance teacher
 Lakshmi Priya as a drama artist
 Kainakary Thankaraj as Panchayath President
 Pauly Valsan as Peethambaran's aunt
 Kalabhavan Shajohn as Kannappan, the village drunkard

Release
The film was released in 75 screens across Kerala. It was made on a budget of 3.78 crore.

Box office
The film was a commercial success. The film collected ₹2 crore from 4 days at the Kerala box office. In two weeks the film had a record distributors share of ₹3.12 crore from 75 screens and gross collection of ₹9.36 crore. It grossed ₹12.75 crore from five weeks.

MG's from B & C stations - Rs 4. 22 crore,  Overseas and Indian domestic - Rs 45 lakhs, Television Rights - Rs 95 lakhs, Telugu Remake Rights - Rs 35 lakhs × Total from all rights = Rs 5 . 97 crore # Profit in 25 days = Rs 2.19 crore.

Music

All songs were composed by Rahul Raj.

References

External links
 
 Annan Thambi preview at Indiaglitz.com

2000s Malayalam-language films
2008 action comedy films
2008 films
Indian action comedy films
Twins in Indian films
Films shot in Pollachi
Films shot in Palakkad
Films directed by Anwar Rasheed
Films scored by Rahul Raj